Margot Yerolymos (born 19 April 1997) is a French professional tennis player.

Yerolymos has career-high WTA rankings of 306 in singles and 348 in doubles. She has won five singles titles and three doubles titles on tournaments of the ITF Women's Circuit.

Career
Yerolymos made her Grand Slam debut at the 2017 French Open thanks to a wildcard for the doubles draw, partnering Fiona Ferro; they lost their first-round match to the second-seeded pair of Ekaterina Makarova and Elena Vesnina.

ITF Circuit finals

Singles: 11 (5 titles, 6 runner–ups)

Doubles: 6 (3 titles, 3 runner-ups)

References

External links
 
 

1997 births
Living people
French female tennis players
People from Martigues
Sportspeople from Bouches-du-Rhône